The 1956 Finnish Cup was the 2nd season of the main annual association football cup competition in Finland. It was organised as a single-elimination knock–out tournament and participation in the competition was voluntary.  The final was held at the Olympic Stadium, Helsinki on 28 October 1956 with Pallo-Pojat defeating Tampereen Kisatoverit by 2–1 before an attendance of 2,020 spectators.

Preliminary round 1

Preliminary round 2

Round 1

Round 2

Round 3

Quarter-finals

Semi-finals

Final

See also 
 1956 Mestaruussarja
 1956–59 Nordic Football Championship

References

External links
 Suomen Cup Official site 

Finnish Cup seasons
Fin
Cup